Brobury is a village in western Herefordshire, England, located between Hereford and Hay-on-Wye.

It lies across the River Wye from Bredwardine, but is joined with Monnington on Wye for civil parish purposes.

References

Villages in Herefordshire

pl:Brobury with Monnington on Wye